This is a list of arachnids observed in the U.S. state of Utah. There are more than 600 species of arachnid in Utah.

Mites

Bindweed gall mite (Aceria malherbae)
Clover mite (Bryobia praetiosa)
Pearleaf blister mite (Eriophyes pyri)
Poplar budgall mite (Eriophyes parapopuli)
Pseudoscorpion (various)
Red spider mite (Tetranychus urticae) - also called "two-spotted spider mite"
Red velvet mite (thousands of species)
Spruce spider mite (Oligonychus ununguis)
Tomato russet mite (Aculops lycopersici)
Western predatory mite (Galendromus occidentalis)

Scorpions

Arizona bark scorpion (Centruroides exilicauda)
Beck desert scorpion (Paruroctonus becki)
Black hairy scorpion (Hadrurus spadix)
Eastern sand scorpion (Paruroctonus utahensis)
Giant desert hairy scorpion (Hadrurus arizonensis)
Northern scorpion (Paruroctonus boreus)
Sawfinger scorpion (Serradigitus wupatkiensis)
Wood scorpion (Anuroctonus phaiodactylus)
Yellow ground scorpion (Vaejovis confusus)

Spiders

American grass spider (Agelenopsis spp.)
American yellow sac spider (Cheiracanthium inclusum)
Ant spider (Micaria pasadena)
Ant spider (Micaria rossica)
Antmimic spider (Meriola decepta )
Banded orb weaving spider (Argiope trifasciata)
Bold jumping spider (Phidippus audax)
Bull-headed sac spider (Trachelas mexicanus)
Camel spider (Ammotrechula spp.)
Camel spider (Eremobates spp.)
Carolina wolf spider (Hogna carolinensis)
Cat-faced spider (Araneus gemmoides)
Cellar spiders (Pholcus phalangioides) - also called "daddy long-legs"
Crab spider (Bassaniana utahensis)
Crab spider (Ebo merkeli)
Crab spider (Ebo pepinensis)
Crab spider (Mecaphesa spp.)
Crab spider (Xysticus discursans)
Crab spider (Xysticus emertoni)
Crab spider (Xysticus facetus)
Crab spider (Xysticus paiutus)
Crab spider (Xysticus pellax )
Eastern parson spider (Herpyllus ecclesiasticus)
False black widow (Steatoda grossa)
Flat-bellied ground spider (Callilepis mumai)
Flattened crab spider (Philodromus histrio)
Flattened crab spider (Philodromus imbecillus)
Flattened crab spider (Philodromus satullus)
Flattened crab spider (Philodromus spectabilis)
Ground spider (Cesonia gertschi)
Ground spider (Drassodes spp.)
Ground spider (Drassyllus inanus)
Ground spider (Drassyllus lepidus)
Ground spider (Drassyllus mexicanus)
Ground spider (Drassyllus nannellus)
Ground spider (Gnaphosa californica)
Ground spider (Gnaphosa clara)
Ground spider (Gnaphosa dentata)
Ground spider (Gnaphosa salsa)
Ground spider (Gnaphosa saxosa)
Ground spider (Gnaphosa sericata)
Ground spider (Gnaphosa synthetica)
Ground spider (Herpyllus cockerelli)
Ground spider (Herpyllus convallis)
Ground spider (Micaria nanella)
Ground spider (Sergiolus lowelli)
Hobo spider (Tegenaria agrestis)
Huntsman spider (Olios fasciculatus)
Huntsman spider (Olios giganteus)
Jumping spider (Habronattus conjunctus)
Jumping spider (Habronattus signatus)
Jumping spider (Habronattus tarsalis)
Jumping spider (Pelegrina verecunda)
Jumping spider (Platycryptus arizonensis)
Jumping spider (Salticus peckhamae)
Jumping spider (Terralonus unicus)
Mormon ant spider (Micaria mormon)
Mormon ground spider (Drassyllus mormon)
Running crab spider (Titanebo dondalei)
Running crab spider (Titanebo magnificus)
Sac spider (Castianeira nanella)
Sac spider (Drassinella unicolor)
Sac spider (Phrurotimpus borealis)
Sac spider (Phrurotimpus nr. woodburyi)
Salt Lake County brown tarantula (Aphonopelma iodius)
Slender crab spider (Tibellus chamberlini)
Slender crab spider (Tibellus duttoni)
Striped lynx spider (Oxyopes scalaris)
Texas running crab spider (Titanebo texanus)
Utah crevice weaver (Kukulcania utahana)
Utah ground spider (Gnaphosa utahana)
Western black widow spider (Latrodectus hesperus)
White-banded crab spider (Misumenoides formosipes)
Wolf spider (Hogna spp.)
Woodlouse spider (Dysdera crocata)

Other

Opiliones (harvestman, "daddy long-legs")
Rocky Mountain wood tick (Dermacentor andersoni)
Soft-bodied tick (Ornithodoros spp.)
Spinose ear tick (Otobius megnini)

References

Arachnids
Utah
Utah